Scratching the Surface may refer to:
 Scratching the Surface (The Groundhogs album)
 Scratching the Surface (Rob Brown and Lou Grassi album)
 "Scratching the Surface", a song by Saga, from the album Heads or Tales
 "Scratching the Surface", an episode of the TV series Mayday